Glycoprotein V (platelet) (GP5) also known as CD42d (Cluster of Differentiation 42d), is a human gene.

Human platelet glycoprotein V (GP5) is a part of the Ib-V-IX system of surface glycoproteins that constitute the receptor for von Willebrand factor (VWF; MIM 193400) and mediate the adhesion of platelets to injured vascular surfaces in the arterial circulation, a critical initiating event in hemostasis. The main portion of the receptor is a heterodimer composed of 2 polypeptide chains, an alpha chain (GP1BA; MIM 606672) and a beta chain (GP1BB; MIM 138720), that are linked by disulfide bonds. The complete receptor complex includes noncovalent association of the alpha and beta subunits with platelet glycoprotein IX (GP9; MIM 173515) and GP5. Mutations in GP1BA, GP1BB, and GP9 have been shown to cause Bernard-Soulier syndrome (MIM 231200), a bleeding disorder.[supplied by OMIM]

See also
 Cluster of differentiation

References

Further reading

External links
 

Clusters of differentiation